Interstate 27 (I-27) is an Interstate Highway, entirely in the US state of Texas, running north from Lubbock to I-40 in Amarillo. These two cities are the only control cities on I-27; other cities and towns served by I-27 include (from south to north) New Deal, Abernathy, Hale Center, Plainview, Kress, Tulia, Happy, and Canyon. In Amarillo, I-27 is commonly known as the Canyon Expressway (or Canyon E-Way), although it is also called Canyon Drive on its access roads. I-27 was officially designated the Marshall Formby Memorial Highway after former attorney and Texas State Senator Marshall Formby in 2005. The entire length of I-27 replaced U.S. Route 87 (US 87) for through traffic.

Route description

I-27 parallels the BNSF Railway's Plainview Subdivision, which splits from its Chicago–Southern California Transcon line at Canyon and runs south to Lubbock. A large amount of the alignment is on former US 87, but several portions through built-up areas have been bypassed, as well as two longer areas where US 87 still follows the old road.

The Interstate begins at a point along the four-lane US 87 freeway south of downtown Lubbock. Mile 0 is posted near 77th Street, about five blocks south of State Highway Loop 289 (Loop 289). Exit numbering begins just to the south, with exit 1 at the 82nd Street interchange; the freeway becomes six lanes at its north end. The Loop 289 interchange is a cloverleaf between the oneway frontage roads of each highway, and with direct ramps from I-27 south to Loop 289 west (exit 1A) and Loop 289 east to I-27 north. US 84 (Avenue Q and Slaton Highway) crosses I-27 at a three-level diamond interchange, with an extra approach from the northeast carrying Avenue A into the junction. Exit 1B connects I-27 south to US 84 and the Loop 289 frontage roads, while all traffic from US 87 north to US 84, Avenue A, or Loop 289 must use exit 1 for 82nd Street.

The six-lane cross section that began at exit 1 remains through Lubbock. Major junctions in that city include US 62/State Highway 114 (SH 11, 19th Street, exit 3) and US 82 (Marsha Sharp Freeway, exit 4). Between these two interchanges, the frontage roads temporarily end as I-27 crosses over a rail line. State Highway Spur 326 (Spur 326, Avenue Q) merges with I-27 at exit 6A, and exit 6B is a split diamond interchange with Loop 289. The outer lanes leave at Farm to Market Road 2641 (FM 2641, Regis Street, exit 8), reducing I-27 to two lanes in each direction as it passes Lubbock Preston Smith International Airport and leaves the city.

I-27 crosses over the Plainview Sub for the first time north of FM 1294 (Drew Street, exit 11), and another short gap exists in the frontage roads there. North of the overpass, the frontage roads are two-way; I-27 then passes through New Deal, bypassing the central part of the town to the west. Old US 87 between exits 13 and 15 is now Loop 461; at exit 15, I-27 begins to parallel the rail line, just to its west. Along this part of the highway, and other similar portions, slip ramps still connect the main lanes with the frontage roads, but intersecting roads pass over all four roadways and the railroad on a long bridge; a pair of two-way roadways connects the frontage roads to the crossroad, with the one on the east crossing the railroad at-grade.

As it approaches Abernathy, I-27 curves west away from the Plainview Sub. The old main road through the city, between exits 20 and 22, is now Loop 369; I-27 passes through 1.5 blocks to the east. Approaching Hale Center, I-27 curves northeast as it splits from FM 1424 (exit 36) at a simple diamond interchange. The freeway passes through the city one block east of the old road, now Business Interstate 27-T (Bus. I-27-T), which is accessed at exits 36 and 38. As it leaves Hale Center, I-27 turns to the northeast, following the northwest side of the rail line.

The next two interchanges along the railroad between Hale Center and Plainview use the same style, in which the crossroad goes over everything. Bus. I-27-U splits at exit 45, a modified Y interchange, to pass through Plainview, and I-27 travels west of that city on a bypass. The two outer interchanges on this bypass, FM 3466 (exit 48) and Quincy Street (exit 51), are handled in the same way as the interchanges along the railroad, but the other two, US 70 (exit 49) and SH 194 (exit 50), are standard diamonds. Between exits 49 and 50 is another overpass over the frontage roads—24th Street—with no separate slip ramps. Bus. I-27-U ends at a trumpet interchange (exit 53) north of Plainview, where I-27 again begins to parallel the Plainview Sub to the west. Both interchanges between this one and the first split with US 87 (exit 61), a modified Y interchange south of Kress, continue the pattern with the crossroad bridging over everything.

After it leaves US 87, I-27 is no longer next to the rail line, but it continues to handle interchanges as it does alongside the line, except at SH 86 (exit 74), a standard diamond that serves Tulia. US 87 rejoins the freeway at a modified diamond interchange (exit 77) north of Tulia, at which I-27 crosses to the east side of the Plainview Sub before paralleling it to that side. After several of the typical interchanges adjacent to the railroad, US 87 splits again at a modified Y interchange (exit 88) south of Happy. Except for the northernmost one, all of the interchanges on the bypass of Happy and Canyon are diamond interchanges; there is a break in the frontage road north of FM 3331 (exit 108), where I-27 crosses the Prairie Dog Town Fork Red River. Exits 109 (Country Club Road) and 110 (US 87 south, US 60 west) are integrated, with some access to one road provided via the other.

I-27 is overlapped by US 60 and US 87 from exit 110 north of Canyon to the end of the Interstate in Amarillo; here, the frontage roads are oneway. Several near the south end are handled by bridging the intersecting road over all roadways, but, once I-27 crosses Loop 335 (exit 116), almost all interchanges are diamond interchanges. At exit 119A, which marks the south end of the six-lane cross section in Amarillo, Hillside Road passes under both the mainlanes and the frontage roads, with two ramps providing partial access. Other connections with Hillside Road are made via Western Street (exit 119B), which crosses the frontage roads at grade. The end of I-27 at I-40 (exit 123B) is a fully directional turbine interchange; US 287 also passes through, using I-40 to the east and US 60/US 87 to the north. Four lanes continue beyond I-40 and are joined by several from the I-40 ramps, making the northernmost portion of the Canyon Expressway five lanes in each direction. Several blocks beyond I-40, the highway ends at a split into two oneway pairs. Northbound traffic feeds onto Fillmore Street (US 87 north) and Buchanan Street (US 60 east and US 287 north), while southbound traffic approaches on Taylor Street (US 287 south) and Pierce Street (US 60 west and US 87 south). The rightmost of the five northbound lanes is barrier-separated from the rest, forcing traffic exiting I-40 west onto Buchanan Street. Through the I-40 interchange and the split, the frontage roads are discontinuous.

History

The roadway between Lubbock and Amarillo was part of the Puget Sound to Gulf Highway (SH 9), one of the original state highways defined in 1917. In 1926, it became part of US 385, which was absorbed into US 87 in 1935. The SH 9 overlap was dropped in the 1939 renumbering. The Canyon Expressway, a freeway upgrade of US 87 (also US 60 there) between Canyon and Amarillo, was built in the late 1950s and early 1960s. The Dumas Expressway, a freeway upgrade of US 87 north from Amarillo, opened several years later, feeding into the same oneway pairs.

Four-laning of US 87 from Canyon to Lubbock was completed in the late 1960s, with the last section to be widened lying between Abernathy and Lubbock. While this was built as a surface divided highway south of Canyon, short sections of freeway were built through New Deal, Abernathy, and Hale Center, and interchanges were built at US 70 and SH 194 on the new bypass of Plainview and at SH 86 (toward the west) south of Tulia. The original two-lane road, where bypassed, became Loop 461 (New Deal, 1968, marked as Bus. US 87-G), Loop 369 (Abernathy, 1962), a local street (Hale Center), and Loop 445 (Plainview, 1967, marked as Bus. US 87-G).

I-27 was not part of the original Interstate Highway System chosen in the 1950s; the spur from I-40 to Lubbock was authorized with the Federal-Aid Highway Act of 1968, which added  to the system. George H. Mahon, member of the US House of Representatives from 1935 to 1979 and chairman of the House Appropriations Committee after 1964, helped secure funding for the road. Texas officially designated the highway in early 1969, originally running from US 62 near downtown Lubbock to I-40 in Amarillo; the definition was extended south through Lubbock to the south side of the loop in early 1976. The existing freeway sections, including the Canyon Expressway, were absorbed into I-27, despite not being built to Interstate standards. New construction began in 1975, from Lubbock north to New Deal, and most of the freeway was completed in the 1980s. Two long sections of US 87 were bypassed: Happy to Canyon on December 5, 1986, and Kress to Tulia soon after; I-27 was complete north of Lubbock by 1988. Most of the Happy–Canyon bypass was built along the two-lane FM 1541, which now ends at exit 103 southeast of Canyon.

The final section of I-27 to be built was through Lubbock, inside Loop 289; this was built in the early 1990s and completed on September 3, 1992. On that day, a ceremony at the 34th Street overpass opened the road from 19th Street (US 62) to 54th Street, completing Texas's  portion of the Interstate Highway System. At its south end, the new I-27 connected to an existing freeway upgrade of US 87, built about 1970, to a traffic circle at US 84 (just north of Loop 289). The old route of US 87 through Lubbock became Bus. US 87-G upon completion of I-27. Two business loops of I-27 have been designated: through Plainview (former Loop 445) in early 1991 and through Hale Center (formerly a local street) in 2002.

The completion of I-27, costing a total of $453.4 million (equivalent to $ million in ), encouraged growth along the highway: toward the northside of Lubbock and the southwest in Amarillo; Canyon has become a suburb of Amarillo. Plainview, the largest city between Lubbock and Amarillo, has the only significant retail cluster outside the two terminal cities and has attracted several industries. On the other hand, Tulia, once a self-contained community with local businesses, was bypassed by I-27, and residents must now drive elsewhere for most shopping needs.

Future 
In 1995, a study of a southern extension of I-27 to I-10 found that a full freeway extension would not be economically feasible, instead recommending limited upgrades to the three corridors studied: SH 349 via Midland and Odessa to east of Fort Stockton, US 87 via Big Spring to Sonora or Junction, and US 84 via Sweetwater to Sonora or Junction. Of the three corridors, the Sweetwater route came the closest to warranting a freeway. The Transportation Equity Act for the 21st Century, passed in 1998, designated I-27 as part of the Ports-to-Plains Trade Corridor, a High Priority Corridor from Mexico at Laredo to Denver. This corridor crosses I-20 at Big Spring and Midland (via a split) and I-10 at Sonora. It also forms part of the Great Plains International Trade Corridor, continuing north to Saskatoon, Saskatchewan. Currently, no interstates connect to Saskatchewan. The part of the Ports-to-Plains Trade Corridor within Texas was a proposed Trans-Texas Corridor. Some parts of this plan have I-14 possibly ending where I-27 will cross I-20. The Texas Department of Transportation (TxDOT) recommends studying I-27 extension again.

On June 10, 2019, Texas Governor Greg Abbott signed Texas House Bill 1079, which authorizes a comprehensive study to extend I-27 north of Amarillo and south of Lubbock to Laredo. The proposed route south of Lubbock would have the Interstate go to Lamesa, then split with one route going toward Midland and the other traveling to Big Spring. The two routes would then merge near Sterling City, travel through San Angelo and Del Rio, travel near the border until Eagle Pass, turn east to Carrizo Springs, then travel south to Laredo.

On March 15, 2022, a bill was signed by President Joe Biden that added the extension of I-27 north to Raton, New Mexico and south to Laredo, Texas to the Interstate Highway System.

Exit list

Business routes

Hale Center

Business Interstate 27-T (Bus. I-27-T) is a  business loop in Hale Center between exits 36 and 38 of I-27. It was bypassed in about 1962 but was turned over to the city until April 5, 2002, when the new business route was authorized. Along the way, it intersects FM 1914 (Cleveland Street).

Major intersections

Plainview

Business Interstate 27-U (Bus. I-27-U) is a  business loop in Plainview.

References

External links

Interstate-Guide: I-27

 
27
27
Transportation in Lubbock County, Texas
Transportation in Hale County, Texas
Transportation in Swisher County, Texas
Transportation in Randall County, Texas
Transportation in Potter County, Texas
Transportation in Amarillo, Texas
Transportation in Lubbock, Texas